Events of 2019 in Zimbabwe.

Incumbents
President: Emmerson Mnangagwa
First Vice President: Constantino Chiwenga 
Second Vice President: Kembo Mohadi
Chief Justice of Zimbabwe: Luke Malaba

Events 

 14-17 January: Nationwide fuel protests in response to a government increase in fuel prices and declining standards of living.
 18 July – ICC suspended the Zimbabwe Cricket from international cricket, citing the political interventions in the Cricket Board of Zimbabwe.

Deaths 

 23 January – Oliver Mtukudzi, Zimbabwean musician, businessman, and philanthropist (b. 1952)
 16 February – Charles Mungoshi, Zimbabwean writer (b. 1947)
 23 February – Dorothy Masuka, Zimbabwean-born South African jazz singer (b. 1935)
 27 February – Buzwani Mothobi, Zimbabwean diplomat, academic, and civil servant (b. 1939)
 15 April – Sithembile Gumbo, Zimbabwean politician (b. 1962)
 23 May – Dumiso Dabengwa, Zimbabwean politician (b. 1939)
 18 June – Obedingwa Mguni, Zimbabwean politician (b. 1962)
 22 August – Peter Chingoka, Zimbabwean cricket player and administrator (b. 1954)
 6 September – Robert Mugabe, Revolutionary and politician, 1st Prime Minister and 2nd President of Zimbabwe (b. 1924)

References 

 
2010s in Zimbabwe
Zimbabwe